Muhammerah may refer to:
 Al-Muhammarah, the Arabic name of Khorramshahr, a city in Iran
 Muhammara, a Levantine condiment
 Muḥammirah, an Iranian religious and political movement